The Hamburg Central Bus Station (abbreviated ZOB, German for Zentraler Omnibusbahnhof) is the central station for long-distance coaches in and out of Hamburg. It is located in the St. Georg district near the Hamburg Hauptbahnhof.
 
The building was designed by the architects ASW Architekten Silcher, Werner und Redante from Hamburg and engineering firm Schlaich Bergermann & Partner from Stuttgart.

In 2006, the structure received the Outstanding Structure Award from the IABSE. The IABSE described it as a "delightful canopy over a bus station with soaring, transparent cantilevers designed to perfection enhancing the urban infrastructure."

Notes

External links 

 Official Website 
 Picture of the ZOB Hamburg 

Buildings and structures in Hamburg-Mitte
Transport in Hamburg
Bus stations in Germany